The Continent is a 2014 Chinese road-trip comedy film written directed by Han Han. The film was released on July 24, 2014.

This movie was produced by Beijing Lorry Ltd, Hangzhou Guomai Media Ltd, and Bona Film Group Ltd. Han Han, a famous youth novelist in mainland China, served as both this movie's screenwriter and director. The film stars William Feng and Bolin Chen in the leading roles.

Production began on February 14, 2014, and wrapped on May 26, 2014. The production team scouted from five locations for filming, which included Shanghai, Xichang, Chifeng, Mount Putuo in Zhoushan, and Dongji Island. One of the leads, William Feng, was injured when the filming process was nearly finished. The film premiered in mainland China on July 24, 2014.

Synopsis 
The movie follows three young men, without much life experience, who live on an island located in the East China Sea. The three hatch a plan to journey across the Chinese mainland, and along the way, documents their experiences before finally ending their journey that will decide their destinies.

Cast
 Feng Shaofeng
 Bolin Chen
 Wallace Chung
 Wang Luodan
 Yuan Quan
 Joe Chen
 Jia Zhangke (cameo)
 White. K
 Kong Lianshun
 Zack Gao

References

External links
 

2014 films
2010s adventure comedy-drama films
2014 romantic comedy-drama films
Chinese adventure comedy-drama films
Chinese romantic comedy-drama films
2014 directorial debut films
2014 comedy films
2014 drama films